Clavulina griseohumicola is a species of fungus in the family Clavulinaceae. Described as new to science in 2005, it occurs in Guyana.

References

External links

Fungi described in 2005
Fungi of Guyana
griseohumicola